Neurolysin (neurotensin endopeptidase, endopeptidase 24.16, endo-oligopeptidase B (proline-endopeptidase)) is an enzyme. This enzyme catalyses the following chemical reaction

 Preferential cleavage in neurotensin: Pro10-Tyr

This enzyme belongs to the peptidase family M3.

References

External links 
 

EC 3.4.24